Raymond Ekevwo (born 23 March 1999) is a Nigerian sprinter. He is the 2019 African Games champion in the 100 metres. He was also a member of the Nigerian  relay team that won a silver medal at the games.

Ekevwo's athletic talent had been obvious since his school days. In 2015, while still a student at High Standard Comprehensive School, Ughelli, he auditioned for the Making of Champions Reality TV athletics competition, Top Sprinter. He eventually had all judges trying to get him on their teams. He won the senior 100 m title and prize at the 2016 edition of the competition while still a junior.

He became the Nigerian junior champion in the 100 metres at the 2016 D K Olukoya Youth and Junior Championships winning with a then personal best of 10.35 s. As the national junior champion, he was selected to represent the country at the 2016 IAAF World U20 Championships. He however missed the race as the Nigerian team did not arrive in time for the competition. He took part in the  relay with teammates Soyemi Abiola, Godwin Ashien and Emmanuel Arowolo but didn't progress to the finals.

Ekevwo joined Oral Roberts University for the 2017 - 2018 season but had a short season due to injuries. He eventually transferred to the University of Florida over the summer for the next season. A team of Ekevwo, Hakim Sani Brown, Grant Holloway and Ryan Clark became the 2019 NCAA champions in the  relay.

He became the fifth Nigerian man to win the African Games title in the 100 m at the 2019 African Games in Rabat. After an unbeaten run through the rounds he clocked an impressive 9.96 s to win the title just ahead of Arthur Cisse. This mark set a new African Games record. He then teamed up with Divine Oduduru, Emmanuel Arowolo and Usheoritse Itsekiri for the  relay. The team placed second behind the Ghanaian team to win the silver medal.

Personal bests 
60 metres: 6.53 s (Fayetteville 2020)

100 metres: 9.96 s (Rabat 2019)

200 metres: 20.84 s (Jacksonville 2019)

4 × 100 metres relay: 37.97 s (Austin 2019)

References

External links

1999 births
Living people
African Games gold medalists for Nigeria
African Games medalists in athletics (track and field)
African Games silver medalists for Nigeria
Athletes (track and field) at the 2019 African Games
Nigerian male sprinters
Sportspeople from Delta State
African Games gold medalists in athletics (track and field)
Florida Gators men's track and field athletes
21st-century Nigerian people
Athletes (track and field) at the 2022 Commonwealth Games
Commonwealth Games bronze medallists for Nigeria
Commonwealth Games medallists in athletics
Medallists at the 2022 Commonwealth Games